Marlena Schoenberg Fejzo, Ph.D., (born February 20, 1968) is an American medical scientist and professor of research on hyperemesis gravidarum and ovarian cancer. She received her undergraduate degree from Brown University in Applied Math in 1989 and a Ph.D. in Genetics from Harvard University in 1995. Currently she has joint appointments in the department of Obstetrics and Gynecology at the University of Southern California and the department of Medicine at the University of California, Los Angeles where she works in the laboratory of Dr. Dennis J. Slamon. She has published peer-reviewed scientific articles on many diseases of women including ovarian cancer, breast cancer, multiple sclerosis, and discovered the first genes for uterine fibroids, nausea and vomiting of pregnancy, and hyperemesis gravidarum. She is a science advisor for the Hyperemesis Education and Research Foundation.

Personal life
Fejzo is the granddaughter of the Austrian composers Arnold Schoenberg and Eric Zeisl, and the sister of the attorney E. Randol Schoenberg. Fejzo has three children: Marko, Mila, and Kala.

Bibliography
Placenta and appetite genes GDF15 and IGFBP7 are associated with HG

References

1968 births
Living people
American medical researchers
American people of Austrian-Jewish descent
Brown University alumni
Harvard University alumni
David Geffen School of Medicine at UCLA faculty
University of Southern California faculty